Grahamtown is an unincorporated community and census-designated place (CDP) in Allegany County, Maryland, United States, located at the southeast edge of Frostburg. As of the 2010 census it had a population of 364. It is part of the Cumberland, MD-WV Metropolitan Statistical Area.

Demographics

Etymology
The town takes its name from Curtis M Graham, who married Susanna Wright, Grand-daughter Of Henry Wright a colonial settler of The area. Curtis owned a farmhouse at this site, surrounded by several small service buildings in the 1880s. A fire gutted the farmhouse in 1995, leaving only an uninhabited shell. Grahamtown is also known as Wright's Crossing, marking the point where Maryland Route 36 crosses Welsh Hill. Wright’s Crossing gets its name from The Wright Farm, a large holding which was owned by Henry Wright a colonial settler of Allegany County. This farm, the centerpoint Of Wright’s Crossing , was originally part of a large colonial estate called Walnut Level.

References 

Census-designated places in Allegany County, Maryland
Census-designated places in Maryland
Populated places in the Cumberland, MD-WV MSA
Cumberland, MD-WV MSA